Sam Duncan is a Gaelic footballer who plays for Milltownpass and at senior level for the Westmeath county team. He plays primarily as a defender, but he has also played in midfield and as a corner-forward.

He was a member of the team that defeated Dublin at Parnell Park in the 2019 O'Byrne Cup final, his county's first time to win that trophy since 1988. He won his second piece of silverware of 2019 when Westmeath won the 2019 National Football League Division 3 league title by a goal against Laois at Croke Park.

Duncan was part of the Westmeath side that won the 2022 Tailteann Cup, playing in the final.

Honours
Westmeath
 Tailteann Cup (1): 2022
 National Football League Division 3 (1): 2019
 O'Byrne Cup (1): 2019

References

Year of birth missing (living people)
Living people
Milltownpass Gaelic footballers
Westmeath inter-county Gaelic footballers